Stadio Pier Giovanni Mecchia, is a multi-purpose stadium in Portogruaro, Italy.  It is mainly used for football matches and hosts the home matches of A.S.D. Portogruaro of the Promozione.  The stadium has a capacity of 4,021 spectators.

Gallery

References

Football venues in Italy
Multi-purpose stadiums in Italy
Venezia F.C.